Santoba FC is an association football club from Guinea. They are members of the Guinée Championnat National.

Football clubs in Guinea